The Primrose Path is a 1934 British romance film directed by Reginald Denham and starring Isobel Elsom, Whitmore Humphries and Max Adrian. The screenplay concerns a doctor's wife who has to choose between her settled life with her husband in a small town or a more turbulent relationship with a successful artist. It was based on a play by Joan Temple.

Plot summary

Cast
 Isobel Elsom - Brenda Dorland 
 Whitmore Humphries - David Marlow 
 Max Adrian - Julian Leigh 
 Virginia Field - Ianthe Dorland 
 Gordon McLeod - Doctor Dorland 
 Helen Ferrers - Mrs Hassee 
 Ethel Stuart - Fortune

References

External links
 
 

1934 films
1930s romance films
Films directed by Reginald Denham
British black-and-white films
British romance films
Films shot at Imperial Studios, Elstree
1930s English-language films
1930s British films